Manuel Plácido de Quirós de Porras (born 1652 in Tineo) was a Spanish clergyman and bishop for the Roman Catholic Archdiocese of Antequera, Oaxaca. He was ordained in 1698. He was appointed bishop in 1698. He died in 1699.

References 

1652 births
1699 deaths
Spanish Roman Catholic bishops
People from Tineo